Kick-to-kick is a pastime and well-known tradition of Australian rules football fans, and a recognised Australian term for kick and catch type games. It is a casual version of Australian rules (similar to the relationship between backyard/beach cricket and the established forms of cricket).

Although not a sport in itself, the term is used to describe a social exercise played in parks, fields, streets, back yards and also as a playground game that requires at least two people.

Kick-to-kick is used as a warm-up exercise of many Australian rules football clubs and has been the beginnings of many clubs in far-flung places. It has long been a pitch invasion tradition in the breaks immediately after official Australian rules football matches, although as professionalism in the Australian Football League increased, the practice was discontinued at most of AFL venues.

Informal kick-to-kick
The two players will space themselves about 15 metres or more apart and alternate kicking whilst the other marks.  Sometimes players will run and/or bounce when returning a long ball and experiment with different kicking styles, such as the drop punt, torpedo punt or checkside punt.  If goal posts are present, participants will often position themselves in front and behind the posts to practice scoring.  Kick-to-kick is often a family pastime and many footballers learned their skills in games of backyard kick-to-kick.  It has been suggested that informal kick-to-kick can assist in battling obesity in children.

Variations
More formal kick-to-kick can involve multiple players, usually grouped in two bunches at either end for easier return of the ball, resulting in similar informal games, such as Force 'em back.  This type of play can include some play contesting, many Australian rules fans requiring a stepladder player to emulate the specky or spectacular mark seen on the football field, often also heard crying out famous names of spectacular mark proponents such as Jesaulenko, Ablett or Capper.

Origins of the pastime
The ancient indigenous Australian game of Marn Grook, which is believed by some to have influenced Australian rules football is similar in many ways to the modern varieties of the kick-to-kick pastime.

Author Sean Fagan claims that the kick-to-kick tradition originates with rugby football in England, citing books from 1856 which make reference to the term "punt about", however although the sources mention kicking practice they do not indicate other participants catching or marking the ball or kicking it back.

Kick-to-kick type practice in other sports
Rugby union and rugby league fans and players do not tend to participate in kick-to-kick as much as Australian rules football fans (primarily because kicking is a specialist technique in these sports; and because of variants of the codes that are playable on a small scale, such as touch football). Gaelic football and association football (soccer) fans also participate in a form of kick-to-kick with the round ball.

References in popular culture
Playing "Kick to kick football" is sometimes used by Australian rules fans as a derogatory term to describe uncontested, possession based style of play sometimes seen at the professional AFL level, which many fans find boring and compare to non-contact sports such as basketball, and netball.  This is because kick-to-kick does not generally involve any of the contesting found in an official game of Australian rules football, such as tackling, bumping, smothering (known as a "charge down" in rugby league), spoiling and other one percenters which often result in more unpredictable change of possession.

Rock band TISM featured a song titled "'And The Ass Said to the Angel: "Wanna Play Kick To Kick?'" on the album Great Truckin' Songs of the Renaissance in 1988.

Michael Leunig painted "Street Football" in 1990.

The pastime inspired a short film named "Kick to Kick" by Tony McNamara in 2000.

Auskick in 2007 used the kick-to-kick tradition as part of their promotional television campaign, which shows kids from around the country kicking the football to each other to the tune of Gimme Dat Ding.

References

Australian rules football terminology
Children's games
Variations of Australian rules football
History of Australian rules football
Sports originating in Australia